The K platform may refer to:

 Chrysler K platform, basis for the 1980s "K cars" and others
 Toyota K platform, basis for the Camry, minivans, SUVs and luxury sedans
 GM K platform (1980), FWD
 GM K platform (1975), RWD